Kaisyuan Rueitian station is a light rail station of the Circular light rail of the Kaohsiung Metro. It is located in Cianjhen District, Kaohsiung, Taiwan.

Station overview
The station is a street-level station with two side platforms. It is located at the junction of Rueitian Street and Kaisyuan 4th Road, near the Kaisyuan Night Market.

Station layout

Around the station
 Kaisyuan Night Market
 Wujia Park

References

2015 establishments in Taiwan
Railway stations opened in 2015
Circular light rail stations